The 1965 New Hampshire Wildcats football team represented the University of New Hampshire as a member of the Yankee Conference during the 1965 NCAA College Division football season. Led by Andy Mooradian in his first and only season as head coach, the Wildcats compiled an overall record of 0–8 with a mark of 0–5 in conference play, placing last out of six teams in the Yankee Conference. New Hampshire played home games at Cowell Stadium in Durham, New Hampshire.

Schedule

References

New Hampshire
New Hampshire Wildcats football seasons
College football winless seasons
New Hampshire Wildcats football